The Open des Volcans was a golf tournament on the Challenge Tour, played in France. It ran annually from 1992 to 2007 and was always played at the Golf des Volcans.

Winners

External links
Official coverage on the Challenge Tour's official site 

Former Challenge Tour events
Defunct golf tournaments in France